Punta Caucedo is a small cape located in the south coast of the Dominican Republic, 15 miles (24 km) east  from Santo Domingo. Las Américas International Airport is located at Punta Caucedo. It is also Sector in the city of Boca Chica in the Santo Domingo Province of the Dominican Republic.

See also
Dominicana DC-9 air disaster

Sources 
Distrito Nacional sectors

Populated places in Santo Domingo Province
Capes of the Dominican Republic